Carlo Cremaschi (born 27 January 1992) is an Italian football defender who played for S.S. Tritium 1908

Domestic League Records

External links

1992 births
Living people
Footballers from Bergamo
Italian footballers
Association football defenders
Tritium Calcio 1908 players